Ongyaw (also known as Ohn Chaw) is a village in Patheingyi Township, Mandalay District, Mandalay Division, Myanmar situated  south-east of Mandalay. The village is the third settlement on National Highway 3 after Mandalay.

References

Populated places in Mandalay Region
Mandalay Region